Wenbo is a given name, usually pronounced as wén bó (文博、文伯）. Notable people with the name include:

Li Wenbo (born 1983), Chinese footballer 
Liang Wenbo (born 1987), Chinese snooker player
Shi Wenbo (born 1950), Chinese businessman
Wang Wenbo (born 1969), Chinese Paralympic athlete
Wei Wenbo (1905–1987), Chinese politician
Zang Wenbo (born 1996), Chinese figure skater